Morton Palms is a civil parish in the Darlington district, in the ceremonial county of Durham, England. In 2001 the parish had a population of 32. The parish borders Barmpton, Great Burdon, Hurworth, Middleton St. George, Neasham and Sadberge.

Listed buildings 
There are five listed buildings in Morton Palms.

History 
The name "Morton" means 'Moor farm/settlement', it was held by Bryan Palms in the 16th century. The site of the deserted medieval village of Morton Palms is marked by the current farm buildings. Formerly a township in the parish of Houghton-le-Skerne, Morton Palms became a civil parish in its own right in 1866.

See also 
 Brick Train

References 

Civil parishes in County Durham
Places in the Borough of Darlington